Open Up Your Head is the debut studio album by English indie rock band Sea Girls. It was released on 14 August 2020 under Polydor and produced by Larry Hibbitt. The album debuted at number three on the UK Albums Chart.

Composition
The themes of the album revolve mainly around frontman Henry Camamile's struggles after his head injury accident when he worked at a pub and how it affected his mental health and love life. During this time, writing songs was his only way to express his true feelings, "I guess that's why the album's called Open Up Your Head," he said to Apple Music. "It was the first place I put into the world what might be going on with me."

Release and promotion
In April 2020, Sea Girls announced that they would release their debut album in August 2020. The album was released on 14 August 2020 and includes their debut single "Call Me Out" (2017), "All I Want to Hear You Say" (2018), "Damage Done" (2019) and three singles that previously appeared on the Under Exit Lights EP (2020), "Closer", "Ready for More" and "Violet". Their two singles, "Do You Really Wanna Know?" and "Forever" supported the album as well. 

A series of intimate album launch shows across the UK were set for November 2020 and January 2021, but due to the COVID-19 pandemic, the album tour was rescheduled several times and finally done in August and September 2021.
The shows were then followed by a UK headline tour in October 2021.

Critical reception

Open Up Your Head received mostly positive reviews from contemporary music critics. At Metacritic, which assigns a normalised rating out of 100 to reviews from mainstream critics, the album received an average score of 77, based on 6 reviews, which indicates "generally favorable reviews". Most of the critics praised the album for its catchy tunes and big pop hooks, as well as personal yet relatable lyrics to the modern youth.

Track listing

Personnel
Credits adapted from AllMusic.

 Sea Girls
Henry Camamile – vocals, guitars
Rory Young – guitars, backing vocals
Andrew Dawson – bass, backing vocals
Oli Khan – drums, keyboards 

 Production
Larry Hibbitt – production
James Mottershead – engineer
Alex O'Donovan – editing, engineer
Cenzo Townshend – mixing
Nick Watson – mastering
Jonny Breakwell – assistant engineer
Billy Foster – assistant engineer
Richie Kennedy – assistant engineer
Xander Wright – assistant engineer
Camden Clarke – mixing assistant
Robert Sellens – mixing assistant 

 Artwork
Richard Andrews – design
Andrew Cooper – photography
Harris Thomlinson Spence – photography
Matthew Parri Thomas – photography

Charts

References

2020 debut albums
Polydor Records albums
Sea Girls albums